Glenea grandis is a species of beetle in the family Cerambycidae. It was described by Bernhard Schwarzer in 1929. It is known from Sumatra.

References

grandis
Beetles described in 1929